Armando Roche (December 7, 1926 – June 26, 1997) was a Cuban pitcher in Major League Baseball. He debuted as an 18 year old for the Washington Senators in its 1945 season.

References

External links

1926 births
1997 deaths
Charlotte Hornets (baseball) players
Chattanooga Lookouts players
Gavilanes de Maracaibo players
Houma Indians players
Kingsport Cherokees players
Major League Baseball pitchers
Major League Baseball players from Cuba
Cuban expatriate baseball players in the United States
Portsmouth Cubs players
Sherbrooke Athletics players
Sportspeople from Maywood, Illinois
Washington Senators (1901–1960) players
Baseball players from Havana